Last 2 Walk is the ninth and latest studio album by American hip hop group Three 6 Mafia, released on June 24, 2008. The album was named Last 2 Walk because DJ Paul and Juicy J were the last two members remaining in Three 6 Mafia. Crunchy Black left the group in late 2006 because of money disputes. "Doe Boy Fresh" featuring Chamillionaire was intended to be the first single, but was ultimately cut from the album. The song was released on January 2, 2007, as a digital download single on iTunes. The lead single from the album is "Lolli Lolli (Pop That Body)". The song features Project Pat, Young D and Superpower. The album features guest appearances from Akon, Good Charlotte, Lyfe Jennings and UGK, among others.

Critical reception

Last 2 Walk received generally mixed reviews from music critics. At Metacritic, which assigns a normalized rating out of 100 to reviews from mainstream critics, the album received an average score of 56, based on 13 reviews, which indicates "mixed or average reviews".

Track listing
All tracks are produced by DJ Paul and Juicy J

Charts

Weekly charts

Year-end charts

References

2008 albums
Three 6 Mafia albums
Columbia Records albums
Albums produced by DJ Paul
Albums produced by Juicy J